José Julio Barillas (born 7 January 1932) is a Guatemalan sprinter. He competed in the men's 100 metres at the 1952 Summer Olympics.

References

1932 births
Living people
Athletes (track and field) at the 1952 Summer Olympics
Guatemalan male sprinters
Olympic athletes of Guatemala
Place of birth missing (living people)